Aisling D'Hooghe (born 25 August 1994) is a Belgian field hockey player. At the 2012 Summer Olympics she competed with the Belgium women's national field hockey team in the women's tournament.

In September 2017, she won the silver medal at the EuroHockey Nations Championship which took place in Amstelveen, the Netherlands. She was also elected as best Goalie of the Tournament by the European Hockey Federation at the end of the tournament. This medal is considered as a major event for the Belgian Women's hockey since it is the first time ever that the team won a medal in a major competition.

References

External links 
 
 

Living people
1994 births
Field hockey players at the 2012 Summer Olympics
Olympic field hockey players of Belgium
Belgian female field hockey players
Female field hockey goalkeepers
People from Uccle
Field hockey players from Brussels